Mega Zeph is a wooden roller coaster located at the abandoned Six Flags New Orleans theme park, in the Eastern New Orleans area of New Orleans, Louisiana, United States. Originally opening on May 20, 2000, as Jazzland's signature ride, the coaster has been abandoned and left in a state of decay as a result of the park's closure following Hurricane Katrina in 2005. It is currently standing but not operating.

History

Mega Zeph takes its name from the original Zephyr or Big Zephyr coaster that operated in the now-defunct Pontchartrain Beach amusement park. The coaster celebrated its topping out ceremony on September 10, 1999, with the installation of the underpinnings of the coaster's highest hump. At the time of its completion, Mega Zeph served as both Jazzland's signature attraction as well as its most visible due to its location adjacent to the Interstate 10/Interstate 510 interchange. The coaster's opening would coincide with the grand opening of Jazzland on May 20, 2000.

After Hurricane Katrina
Shuttered since August 2005 due to severe flooding in the park as a result of Hurricane Katrina, the park has remained closed. Decisions haven't been made as to what to do with the rides. Each ride is decaying, damaged, and unusable. More information will be released at a later date. In 2007, Six Flags was in the process of removing some of its rides. The first ride to leave was Batman: The Ride, which was removed and taken to Six Flags Fiesta Texas, where it was refurbished and reopened as Goliath on April 18, 2008. Bayou Blaster and Sonic Slam were removed and taken to Great Escape in Queensbury, New York, where it was refurbished and reopened as Sasquatch on May 10, 2009. The final ride to leave Six Flags New Orleans was the Road Runner Express, which was removed in 2009 and taken to Six Flags Magic Mountain, where it was refurbished and reopened on May 28, 2011 under the same name. As of February 2016, the Mega Zeph has remained unused since August 2005, but may potentially reopen as part of a redevelopment of the park announced in August 2009 by New Orleans mayor Ray Nagin. Rumors still float around regarding the history of the park. A large section on the Mega Zeph track has completely fallen to the ground due to the decaying of the wood. The majority of the wood from Mega Zeph has decayed and the steel track has severely rusted. Also, the only train has been sent to Six Flags St. Louis. They are now being stored under Batman: The Ride.

Mega Zeph will cost around $3 million (USD) to fix and have the ride back to operating after Hurricane Katrina in August 2005.

Mega Zeph was featured in the 20th Century Fox film Percy Jackson: Sea of Monsters along with several other rides including Ozarka Splash, released August 16, 2013. Mega Zeph was lined with lights along the coaster and resurrected just enough to have a car zoom in and out of frame during the shooting of the film. In the film, Six Flags New Orleans  portrayed the park  Circeland on the island of Polyphemus, that was built by the goddess Circe, only to be destroyed by the cyclops Polyphemus.

The National Roller Coaster Museum and Archives was able to preserve the neon sign from the ride's entrance at its facility in Plainview, TX.

Ride Layout

After passengers left the station, passengers climbed a  lift hill culminating in its first drop. The train then made a quick descent towards a high speed turnaround near the lake's edge. The physical construction of the ride is unique in that it consisted of steel construction with a wooden track.

References

Roller coasters operated by Six Flags
Six Flags New Orleans
Former roller coasters in Louisiana